Marius Bratu (born 27 February 1973) is a Romanian football coach and a former player. He is the manager of CS Dinamo. He played as a goalkeeper for Rapid București, FCM Bacău or Astra Ploiești, among other teams. After retirement, he was the executive president of CSM Focșani, then the manager of the senior team.

Honours
Rapid București
Supercupa României winner: 1999

References

1973 births
Living people
Sportspeople from Focșani
Romanian footballers
Association football goalkeepers
Liga I players
Liga II players
CSM Focșani players
FC Progresul București players
FC Rapid București players
FCM Bacău players
FC Astra Giurgiu players
FC Petrolul Ploiești players
FC Vaslui players
Russian Premier League players
FC Elista players
Romanian expatriate footballers
Romanian expatriate sportspeople in Russia
Expatriate footballers in Russia
Romanian football managers